Pharae (Ancient Greek: Φαραί) is an ancient city of Achaea.

Pharae may also refer to:
Pharae (Boeotia), an ancient city of Boeotia
Pharae (Crete), an ancient city of Crete
Pharae (Laconia), an ancient city of Laconia
Pharae (Messenia), an ancient city of Messenia

See also
Pherae, an ancient city of Thessaly